Pycina is a genus of butterflies in the family Nymphalidae found from Mexico to South America.

Species
There are two recognised species:
Pycina zamba Doubleday, 1849
Pycina zelys Godman & Salvin, 1884

References
 "Pycina Doubleday, [1849]" at Markku Savela's Lepidoptera and Some Other Life Forms

Coeini
Nymphalidae of South America
Butterfly genera